The North American Tour 2012 was a concert tour by the English rock band New Order.

Background
In July 2012, New Order announced their first North American tour in seven years. Initially scheduled to play six shows in the United States and one show in Canada, the band later added additional shows at the Roseland Ballroom in New York City and the Sony Centre for the Performing Arts in Toronto, along with their very first show in Mexico as part of the Corona Capital Festival held annually at the Autódromo Hermanos Rodríguez (Rodríguez Brothers Racetrack) in Mexico City. The Toronto shows were the band's first in Canada since 2001.

Opening acts

Run Run Run (Oakland, Los Angeles)
DJ Brent Hall (Oakland)
DJ Mario Cotto (Los Angeles)
Flashlights (Broomfield)
DJ Boyhollow (Broomfield)
Ishi (Dallas)
DJ Little Man (Dallas)
Win Win (New York City, Toronto)
DJs Justin Strauss and Billy Caldwell (New York City; 18 October 2012)
DJs Adesh and Lara (New York City; 19 October 2012)
The Hudson Branch (Chicago)
DJ Nate Manic (Chicago)
DJ Nick Fiorucci (Toronto)

Setlist
{{hidden
| headercss = background: #ccccff; font-size: 100%; width: 90%;
| contentcss = text-align: left; font-size: 100%; width: 90%;
| header = Oakland; 5 October 2012
| content =
"Elegia"
"Crystal"
"Ceremony"
"Close Range"
"Age of Consent"
"Isolation"
"Here to Stay"
"Your Silence Face"
"Bizarre Love Triangle" 
"5 8 6"  
"True Faith"
"The Perfect Kiss"
"Blue Monday"
"Temptation"
Encore
 "Atmosphere"
 "Love Will Tear Us Apart"
}}

{{hidden
| headercss = background: #ccccff; font-size: 100%; width: 90%;
| contentcss = text-align: left; font-size: 100%; width: 90%;
| header = Los Angeles; 7 October 2012
| content =
"Elegia"
"Crystal"
"Ceremony"
"Age of Consent"
"Isolation"
"Love Vigilantes"
"Close Range"
"Your Silence Face"
"Bizarre Love Triangle" 
"5 8 6"  
"True Faith"
"The Perfect Kiss"
"Blue Monday"
"Temptation"
Encore
 "Atmosphere"
 "Love Will Tear Us Apart"
}}

{{hidden
| headercss = background: #ccccff; font-size: 100%; width: 90%;
| contentcss = text-align: left; font-size: 100%; width: 90%;
| header = Broomfield; 10 October 2012
| content =
"Elegia"
"Crystal"
"Regret"
"Ceremony"
"Age of Consent"
"Isolation"
"Here to Stay"
"Your Silence Face"
"Bizarre Love Triangle" 
"5 8 6"  
"True Faith"
"The Perfect Kiss"
"Blue Monday"
"Temptation"
Encore
 "Atmosphere"
 "Transmission"
 "Love Will Tear Us Apart"
}}

{{hidden
| headercss = background: #ccccff; font-size: 100%; width: 90%;
| contentcss = text-align: left; font-size: 100%; width: 90%;
| header = Dallas; 12 October 2012
| content =
"Elegia"
"Crystal"
"Ceremony"
"Age of Consent"
"Love Vigilantes" 
"Isolation"
"Here to Stay"
"Your Silence Face"
"Bizarre Love Triangle" 
"5 8 6"  
"True Faith"
"The Perfect Kiss"
"Blue Monday"
"Temptation"
Encore
 "Atmosphere"
 "Shadowplay"
 "Transmission"
 "Love Will Tear Us Apart"
}}

{{hidden
| headercss = background: #ccccff; font-size: 100%; width: 90%;
| contentcss = text-align: left; font-size: 100%; width: 90%;
| header = Mexico City; 14 October 2012
| content =
"Elegia"
"Crystal"
"Ceremony"
"Age of Consent"
"Isolation"
"Here to Stay"
"Your Silence Face"
"Bizarre Love Triangle" 
"5 8 6"  
"True Faith"
"The Perfect Kiss"
"Blue Monday"
"Temptation"
Encore
 "Atmosphere"
 "Love Will Tear Us Apart"
}}

{{hidden
| headercss = background: #ccccff; font-size: 100%; width: 90%;
| contentcss = text-align: left; font-size: 100%; width: 90%;
| header = New York City; 18 October 2012
| content =
"Elegia"
"Crystal"
"Ceremony"
"Age of Consent"
"Love Vigilantes" 
"Here to Stay"
"Your Silence Face"
"1963"
"Close Range"
"Bizarre Love Triangle" 
"5 8 6"  
"True Faith"
"The Perfect Kiss"
"Blue Monday"
"Temptation"
Encore
 "Atmosphere"
 "Love Will Tear Us Apart"
}}

{{hidden
| headercss = background: #ccccff; font-size: 100%; width: 90%;
| contentcss = text-align: left; font-size: 100%; width: 90%;
| header = New York City; 19 October 2012
| content =
"Elegia"
"Crystal"
"Ceremony"
"Age of Consent"
"Isolation"
"Here to Stay"
"Your Silence Face"
"Krafty"
"Close Range"
"Bizarre Love Triangle" 
"5 8 6"  
"True Faith"
"The Perfect Kiss"
"Blue Monday"
"Temptation"
Encore
 "Atmosphere"
 "Love Will Tear Us Apart"
}}

{{hidden
| headercss = background: #ccccff; font-size: 100%; width: 90%;
| contentcss = text-align: left; font-size: 100%; width: 90%;
| header = Chicago; 21 October 2012
| content =
"Elegia"
"Crystal"
"Regret"
"Ceremony"
"Age of Consent"
"Love Vigilantes" 
"Here to Stay"
"Your Silence Face"
"Close Range"
"Bizarre Love Triangle" 
"5 8 6"  
"True Faith"
"The Perfect Kiss"
"Blue Monday"
"Temptation"
Encore
 "Heart and Soul"
 "Atmosphere"
 "Love Will Tear Us Apart"
}}

{{hidden
| headercss = background: #ccccff; font-size: 100%; width: 90%;
| contentcss = text-align: left; font-size: 100%; width: 90%;
| header = Toronto; 23 October 2012
| content =
"Elegia"
"Crystal"
"Regret"
"Ceremony"
"Age of Consent"
"Isolation"
"Here to Stay"
"Your Silence Face"
"Waiting for the Sirens' Call"
"Bizarre Love Triangle" 
"5 8 6"  
"True Faith"
"The Perfect Kiss"
"Blue Monday"
"Temptation"
Encore
 "Transmission"
 "Love Will Tear Us Apart"
}}

{{hidden
| headercss = background: #ccccff; font-size: 100%; width: 90%;
| contentcss = text-align: left; font-size: 100%; width: 90%;
| header = Toronto; 24 October 2012
| content =
"Elegia"
"Crystal"
"Regret"
"Ceremony"
"Age of Consent"
"Love Vigilantes" 
"Krafty"
"Your Silence Face"
"Close Range"
"Bizarre Love Triangle" 
"5 8 6"  
"True Faith"
"The Perfect Kiss"
"Blue Monday"
"Temptation"
Encore
 "Shadowplay"
 "Transmission"
 "Love Will Tear Us Apart"
}}

Tour dates

Festivals and other miscellaneous performances
This concert was a part of the Corona Capital Festival.

References 

2012 concert tours
Concert tours of North America
New Order (band) concert tours
October 2012 events in North America